Edgerton is a village in central Alberta, Canada. it is located  east of Wainwright.

The village has the name of H. H. Edgerton, an official of the Grand Trunk Pacific Railway.

Demographics 

In the 2016 Census of Population conducted by Statistics Canada, the Village of Edgerton recorded a population of 384 living in 177 of its 192 total private dwellings, a  change from its 2011 population of 317.

Education 
There is one school in Edgerton covering kindergarten - 12.  Edgerton Public School is one of twenty that come under the responsibility and direction of the Buffalo Trail Regional School Division.

See also 
List of communities in Alberta
List of villages in Alberta

References

External links 

1917 establishments in Alberta
Villages in Alberta
Populated places established in 1917